Cameron Drew Neru Howieson (born 22 December 1994) is a New Zealand footballer who plays as an attacking midfielder for Auckland City in the New Zealand Football Championship. He has represented New Zealand in international football.

Howieson signed a professional two-and-a-half-year contract with Burnley in March 2012, having joined from the Asia–Pacific Football Academy in July 2011, having previously played for Mosgiel AFC. He made his first-team debut in April 2012. He has represented New Zealand at the 2011 OFC U-17 Championship and 2011 FIFA U-17 World Cup.

Club career

Early career
Howieson started his career with Mosgiel AFC, whilst attending Otago Boys' High School for two years, before departing for the Lincoln-based Asia–Pacific Football Academy in 2010, where he played for two years. He was spotted by football scout Graham McMann – a former under-16 coach at Burnley – whilst playing in the under-14 South Island tournament in Timaru. McMann continued to track his progress at the APFA for two years, where he had formerly worked as a scout. McMann got in touch with his contacts at Football League side Burnley, who agreed to give Howieson a week on trial in April 2011. He made an instant impression on the club's coaching staff after scoring two goals in a trial match against Carlisle United.

Burnley

Howieson signed a two-year scholarship with Burnley in July 2011, after impressing on trial. He scored his first goal for the youth team in November 2011, in a 6–1 win over rivals Preston North End. Howieson grabbed headlines when he scored two goals in the FA Youth Cup quarter final against Fulham in February 2012, helping the Clarets in to the semi-finals for the first time since 1978. His performances in the FA Youth Cup attracted interests from Newcastle and Liverpool in March 2012. On 29 March 2012, Howieson signed professional terms with Burnley on a two-and-a-half-year deal, keeping him at the club until June 2014.
On 31 March, Howieson was named on the bench for Burnley's game away at Portsmouth and as such was given squad number 32, however, he was an unused substitute. He made his senior debut three days later in a 3–1 defeat against Birmingham City in the Football League Championship, replacing Josh McQuoid as an 84th-minute substitute. Whilst doing so, he became the youngest ever Kiwi in the Football League at the age of 17 years and 103 days, beating the previous record by 22 days, set by Chris Wood for West Bromwich Albion in April 2009. He also became the youngest Burnley player in a quarter of a century.

On 21 February 2013, he joined League One side Doncaster Rovers on a youth loan until the end of the season.

In April 2015, after struggling to make a breakthrough into the first team, it was announced that Howieson would not be offered a new contract and he was released from the club.

St Mirren
On 24 July 2015, Howieson joined Scottish Championship side St Mirren on a one-year deal after a trial. He scored a goal on his league debut, a loss to Rangers on 7 August 2015. Howieson was released by St Mirren at the end of the 2015–16 season.

Team Wellington
Howieson returned to New Zealand in September 2016 to sign with Team Wellington in the New Zealand Football Championship.

Auckland City FC

On 10 January 2017, he moved to Auckland City FC.

International career
Howieson was born in Blenheim, New Zealand, to a Scottish-born father and a mother of Samoan heritage. Under FIFA eligibility rules he can represent New Zealand, Scotland, England and Samoa. In January 2011, Howieson was called up to the New Zealand squad for the 2011 OFC U-17 Championship, hosted by New Zealand. He scored a header in New Zealand's first game of the tournament, in a 5–1 win over Vanuatu. He featured in the remaining three group games as New Zealand progressed to the final. They won their fourth title courtesy of a 2–0 victory over Tahiti in the final, with Howieson scoring a 30-yard free-kick. Due to the tournament win, New Zealand qualified for the 2011 FIFA U-17 World Cup in Mexico. Howieson was part of the squad that participated, featuring in all three group games as New Zealand progressed to the Round-of-16. New Zealand were eventually knocked out by Japan in a 6–0 defeat, however, Howieson was suspended due to picking up two bookings in the group stage. In 2012, Howieson had overtures from a Scottish Football Association scout about switching his international allegiance to Scotland. He stated that he wished to represent New Zealand at the 2015 FIFA U-20 World Cup hosted in his home country.

On 14 May 2012, Howieson was called up to the New Zealand senior squad for their upcoming World Cup qualifiers. On 24 May 2012, Howieson came on as a 72nd-minute substitute in the All White's international friendly against El Salvador. He also made an appearance at the 2012 OFC Nations Cup as a second-half substitute.

On 21 June 2012, Howieson was called up to the New Zealand Under-23 squad for the Summer Olympic Games in London. Howieson the played in all three of New Zealand's fixtures during the games, appearing each time as a substitute. This included a full 45 minute appearance against Brazil which ended in a 3–0 defeat. New Zealand were eliminated from their group after collecting only one point from a 1–1 draw with Egypt.

After a four-year hiatus, Howieson's form at Auckland City led to an All Whites recall under new head coach Fritz Schmid.

Career statistics

Club

International

Honours

Country
New Zealand
 OFC U-20 Championship: 2013
 OFC U-17 Championship: 2011

References

External links
 
 
 
 NZ Football Profile

1994 births
Living people
Association footballers from Dunedin
New Zealand people of Scottish descent
New Zealand sportspeople of Samoan descent
New Zealand association footballers
New Zealand international footballers
Association football midfielders
Burnley F.C. players
Doncaster Rovers F.C. players
English Football League players
St Mirren F.C. players
Scottish Professional Football League players
Olympic association footballers of New Zealand
2012 OFC Nations Cup players
Footballers at the 2012 Summer Olympics
New Zealand under-20 international footballers
People from Blenheim, New Zealand
New Zealand Football Championship players
New Zealand expatriate sportspeople in England